Lophocampa endolobata is a moth of the family Erebidae. It was described by George Hampson in 1901. It is found in Brazil.

Description

Ochreous; head and thorax tinged with brown; abdomen yellow. Forewing with about ten waved brown lines forming lunulate spots on postmedial area and somewhat diamond-shaped subterminal spots; a large clouded discoidal spot. Hindwing pale semihyaline yellow.

Wingspan 40 mm.

References

 

endolobata
Moths described in 1901